Chilostoma ambrosi is a species of medium-sized, air-breathing, land snail, a terrestrial pulmonate gastropod mollusk in the family Helicidae, the true snails. The species is endemic to Italy, and is currently Near threatened due to tourism.

References

Chilostoma